The 1988 Davidson Wildcats football team represented Davidson College as a member of the Colonial League during the 1988 NCAA Division I-AA football season. Led by fourth-year head coach Vic Gatto, the Wildcats compiled an overall record of 0–10 with a mark of 0–4 in conference play, placing last out of six teams in the Colonial.

Schedule

References

Davidson
Davidson Wildcats football seasons
College football winless seasons
Davidson Wildcats football